Karmanos may refer to
Barbara Ann Karmanos, breast cancer victim, wife of Peter Karmanos
Karmanos Cancer Institute in Detroit, U.S., named after Barbara
Peter Karmanos Jr. (born 1943), American business executive
Danialle Karmanos (born 1973), American philanthropist and community activist